The 2005 World Games were held in Duisburg, Germany, from July 14 to July 24, 2005.

Acrobatic gymnastics

Aerobic gymnastics

Artistic roller skating

Bodybuilding

Boules sports

Bowling

Canoe polo

Casting

Cue sports

Dancesport

Field archery

Finswimming

Fistball

Flying disc

Inline hockey

Inline speed skating

Ju-jitsu

Karate

Korfball

Lifesaving

Orienteering

Parachuting

Powerlifting

Rhythmic gymnastics

Rugby sevens

Sport climbing

Squash

Sumo

Trampoline gymnastics

Tug of war

Water skiing

Invitational sports

American football

Beach handball

Dragon boat

Indoor hockey

Indoor motorcycle trials

References

External links
 Medalists
 International World Games Association

Medalists
2005